Daikan (代官) was an official in Japan that acted on behalf of a ruling monarch or a lord at the post they had been appointed to. Since the Middle Ages, daikan were in charge of their territory and territorial tax collection. In the Edo period, daikan were local governors in charge of the government and security of domain and shogunate territories.

Overview
In addition, it became a political system in which a deputy who had a bad reputation for self-interest was immediately dismissed. This is because the harsh collection of annual tribute leads to the escape of farmers, which in turn reduces the yield of annual tribute. In fact, some officials were dismissed and punished for causing starvation during famines. On the other hand, however, there were other daikans worthy of being called famous daikans, such as Suzuki Shigenari, who continued to appeal to the shogunate for a reduction or exemption of annual tribute at the cost of his own life in order to save the people of the domain from heavy taxes, and Ido Masaaki, who also saved the people from famine by introducing ganzo to the territories under his control.

History 
In the Middle Ages, azukaridokoro and ukesho referred to daikan of a feudal lord, and shugo-dai and jitō-dai referred to daikan of shugo and jitō governors, respectively. In the Azuchi-Momoyama period, territorial rulers in charge of local tax collection were called daikan.

In the Edo period, high-ranking hatamoto retainers of the shogun were appointed daikan to govern the shogunal demesne across Japan and were given a 50,000-100,000 koku territory. The daikan worked from their administrative headquarters (jin'ya) at their territory or their mansion in Edo, under the Commissioner of Finance (kanjō bugyō), and had a dozen of tetsuki and tedai officials under their service. Hereditary succession of the position was common. In 1867, at the end of the Edo period, there were 37 daikan.

In the latter half of the Edo period, the feudal domains followed the example and appointed their own daikan, district magistrates, who were called gun-dai or kōri bugyō.

References 

Government of feudal Japan
Officials of the Tokugawa shogunate